Xinxing Township (新兴乡) could refer to the following places in the People's Republic of China:

Xinxing Township, Yi'an County, Heilongjiang
Xinxing Township, Hanshou County, Hunan
Xinxing Township, Tongyu County, Jilin
Xinxing Township, Yitong County, in Yitong Manchu Autonomous County, Jilin
Xinxing Township, Luding County, Sichuan
Xinxing Township, Mianning County, Sichuan
Xinxing Township, Songyang County, Zhejiang
Xinxing Oroqen Ethnic Township (新兴鄂伦春族乡), Xunke County, Heilongjiang
Xinxing Township, Gangu County, Gansu 
See also

Xinxing (disambiguation)

Township name disambiguation pages